"No Quiero Escuchar Tu Voz" is the debut single by Chilean singer and actress Denise Rosenthal from her first solo studio album, El Blog de la Feña, released in Chile on 9 August 2008. The song was written during 2008 by Gonzalo Yañez; this song was one of the songs most played in the radio stations on Chile in 2008.

Music video
The music video for this song was directed by Juan Pablo Sanchez in Santiago, Chile. The video shows to denise filming one commercial in where she is harassed by a guy, but she not been interested one in he, here it shows to denise as the whole star but at the same time enjoying the things that she likes to do and to be with her friends. The music video was premiered in Canal 13 and later was premiered in exclusive for MTV on 28 July 2008. The video debuted at number 8 on Los 10+ Pedidos and later peaked at number 1.

Track listing
Promo Single
 "No Quiero Escuchar Tu Voz" (Radio version) – 2:44
 "No Quiero Esccuhar Tu Voz" (Album version) – 2:46
 "Porque Tú" (Non-album track) – 2:46

References

External links
 Denise Rosenthal official Music My Space

2008 singles
Denise Rosenthal songs
Songs written by Gonzalo Yañez
2008 songs